The 1971–72 season was the 92nd season of competitive football in England.

Honours

Notes = Number in parentheses is the times that club has won that honour. * indicates new record for competition

FA Cup 

Leeds United won the FA Cup for the first time in their history by beating the previous year's winners, Arsenal, 1–0 in the final at Wembley. Allan Clarke scored the winning goal.

1971–72 marked the centenary of the FA Cup. Non-League club Hereford United of the Southern League provided one of the shocks of the season by knocking out Newcastle United 2–1 after extra time in the 3rd Round Replay.

League Cup 

Stoke City won the 1972 Football League Cup Final to claim the only major trophy in their history.

Football League

First Division
Brian Clough, 37, won the first major trophy of his managerial career by guiding Derby County to their first league championship. They overcame Leeds United, Liverpool and Manchester City to win a four-horse race, with only a single point separating them. It was so close that when Manchester City won their last game of the season – against Derby on 22 April 1972 – they were top of the league by a point but had no chance of being champions, as Derby and Liverpool both had games in hand, were still to play each other, and both boasted a superior goal average to City's.

Although Derby beat Liverpool to pass Manchester City at the top of the table, Liverpool (two points back) and Leeds (one point back) each still had a game left. Leeds, who had won the FA Cup for the first time of their history, could have completed the double by avoiding defeat against Wolverhampton Wanderers, but instead lost 2–1. Liverpool could also have overtaken Derby by defeating Arsenal, but could muster only a 0–0 draw. This assured Derby the title by a single point.

There were bribery allegations from The Sun newspaper regarding Leeds's manager Don Revie, who stood accused of attempting to bribe Wolves on the final day of the season. Their captain Billy Bremner won a high court battle to clear his name of the allegations, with evidence provided by the Wolves striker Derek Dougan.

Stoke City won the League Cup, their first major trophy.

Nottingham Forest and Huddersfield Town lost their First Division status. 1971–72 was Huddersfield's last season in the top flight until 2017, and within a few seasons they fell into the Fourth Division.

Second Division
Norwich City won the Second Division and were promoted along with Birmingham City. This marked the first time that Norwich City reached the top flight in their history, less than 70 years after the club was founded. Charlton Athletic and Watford were relegated.

Third Division
Aston Villa ended their two-year spell in the Third Division by gaining promotion as champions, and by the end of the decade would be firmly re-established as a First Division club. Brighton & Hove Albion followed Villa into the Second Division. Mansfield Town, Barnsley, Torquay United and Bradford City were relegated.

Fourth Division
Grimsby Town, Southend United, Brentford and Scunthorpe United were promoted from the Fourth Division. Barrow were voted out of the Football League and replaced by Hereford United, who a short time earlier had achieved a shock FA Cup victory over Newcastle United.

Ernie Tagg sacked himself as manager of Crewe Alexandra because he felt that a younger manager should take charge of the club.

Top goalscorers

First Division
Francis Lee (Manchester City) – 33 goals

Second Division
Bob Latchford (Birmingham City) – 23 goals

Third Division
Ted MacDougall (AFC Bournemouth) – 35 goals

Fourth Division
Peter Price (Peterborough United) – 28 goals

European competitions 
The 1972 UEFA Cup Final was the final of the first ever UEFA Cup and was contested by two English teams, Wolverhampton Wanderers and Tottenham Hotspur. Spurs won 2–1 in the first leg at the Molineux on 3 May. The second leg, played on 17 May at White Hart Lane, ended 1–1. The 3–2 aggregate win by Tottenham Hotspur gave them the second European trophy in their history

Diary of the season 

8 July 1971: Bill Shankly signs a three-year contract as Liverpool manager which will keep him in charge until the end of the 1973–74 season.

7 August 1971: The 1971 FA Charity Shield is held, but without reigning League and Cup winners Arsenal, who are on a pre-season tour abroad. The Shield was won by Second Division champions Leicester City, who beat 1971 FA Cup Final runners-up Liverpool with a Steve Whitworth goal; Arsenal were beaten 1–0 by Feyenoord.

20 August 1971: Manchester United beat Arsenal 3–1 in a "home" tie, played at Anfield in Liverpool as a result of a ban from hosting their first two home games in Manchester, the second would be held at the Victoria Ground in Stoke-on-Trent.

13 October 1971: England earn a vital European Championship qualifying win in Switzerland. Anton Weibel scores a late own goal as England win 3-2 in Basel to go top of Group 3.

6 November 1971: The Manchester derby at Maine Road ends in a 3–3 thriller, with debutant 17-year-old winger Sammy McIlroy on the scoresheet for United.

10 November 1971: England draw 1-1 with Switzerland at Wembley to leave them in pole position to qualify for the European Championship quarter finals.  Mike Summerbee scores early, with Karl Odermatt equalizing for the Swiss.

27 November 1971: Alan Woodward scores four of the seven Sheffield United put past Ipswich Town without reply, while elsewhere, George Best is the hat-trick hero as Manchester United beat Southampton 5–2, and Wolverhampton Wanderers beat West Bromwich Albion 3–2 in the Black Country derby.

1 December 1971: England win their European Championship qualifying group with a 2-0 win in Greece.  Geoff Hurst and Martin Peters score the goals.

15 December 1971: John Ritchie's goal and a penalty save from Gordon Banks gives Stoke City a replay in the Football League Cup semi-final against West Ham United.

31 December 1971: At the end of the year, Manchester United are top of the First Division, three points ahead of Manchester City and four ahead of Leeds United. West Bromwich Albion and Nottingham Forest occupy the relegation places.

29 January 1972: In the second League Cup semi-final replay, at Old Trafford, Stoke overcome a West Ham side forced to make Bobby Moore their stand-in goalkeeper, putting them through to the League Cup Final for the first time.

19 February 1972: Leeds United thrash Manchester United 5–1 at Elland Road and are two points behind Manchester City at the top of the table. Manchester United have now lost five League matches in a row.

23 February 1972: Second division Sheffield Wednesday host touring Brazilians Santos at Hillsborough stadium in a match played on a weekday afternoon due to the miners' strike.  37,000 spectators witness a 2-0 win for the Brazilian side who have Pelé in their line-up.

4 March 1972: Leeds United beat Southampton 7–0 and will overtake Manchester City at the top of the table if they win their two games in hand. Manchester United are beaten for the sixth consecutive match in the League when they lose 2–0 to Tottenham Hotspur.

6, 7 Match 1972: Derby County manager Brian Clough announces the signing of Nottingham Forest striker Ian Storey-Moore; this is disputed by the selling club and the player is in fact sold to Manchester United for £200,000.

8 March 1972: Rodney Marsh moves from Queens Park Rangers to Manchester City for £200,000.

31 March 1972: Brian Clough dismisses reports that he is to be Noel Cantwell's successor as Coventry City manager. Meanwhile, on the pitch, in the First Division, Leeds' failure to beat West Ham sees them miss the opportunity to top the table, victory for Millwall allows them to ascend to the summit of the Second Division ahead of Norwich City and Birmingham City, Third Division table-toppers Aston Villa pull away from AFC Bournemouth, and Grimsby Town move into second in the bottom tier (behind rivals Scunthorpe United) with a win over Reading, becoming the first League side to score 50 this season.

1 April 1972: Derby County beat Leeds United 2–0 and take over at the top of the First Division.

26 April 1972: Derby County win the Texaco Cup by beating Airdrieonians 2–1 on aggregate. Crystal Palace's 2–0 win over Stoke City relegates both Nottingham Forest and Huddersfield Town from the First Division.

1 May 1972: Derby County, in their last League game of the season, beat Liverpool 1–0. Leeds United beat Chelsea 2–0 and will win the title if they can beat Wolverhampton Wanderers in their final fixture.

6 May 1972: Leeds United win the FA Cup for the first time in their history by beating Arsenal 1–0 in the final at Wembley, with Allan Clarke heading the only goal in the second half.

8 May 1972: Derby County win the League Championship as neither Leeds United nor Liverpool manage to win their final league games. Leeds would have overtaken Derby on goal average had they drawn with Wolverhampton Wanderers at Molineux, but lose 2-1, while Liverpool draw 0-0 with Arsenal at Highbury.

11 May 1972: The First Division season ends when Tottenham Hotspur beat Arsenal 2–0 in the North London derby at Highbury.

Star players
Gordon Banks was voted FWA Footballer of the Year to add to his League Cup winners medal.
Norman Hunter and Billy Bremner helped Leeds win the FA Cup.
Roy McFarland and Colin Todd helped Derby win the League Championship.

Star managers
Brian Clough guided Derby to their first-ever league championship triumph.
Don Revie helped Leeds lift the FA Cup for the first time.
Tony Waddington ended Stoke City's trophyless history by winning the League Cup.

National team
England were eliminated from the 1972 European Championships in the quarter-finals after losing 3–1 on aggregate over two legs (1–3 at Wembley and 0–0 in West Berlin) to West Germany, who went on to win the tournament.

References

 
English Football, 1971-72 In
English Football, 1971-72 In